Raymond Cyrus "R.C." Hoiles (November 24, 1878 – October 31, 1970) was an American newspaper publisher.  He was born in Alliance, Ohio, and started his career as a subscription solicitor in the local newspaper The Alliance Review.  Hoiles and his brother bought among many newspapers Santa Ana Daily Register in 1935.  Hoiles became president of Freedom Newspapers in 1950, in which position he stayed until his death in 1970.

Biography 
Hoiles was born on November 24, 1878, in Alliance, Ohio, into a middle-class family. His parents were Samuel Harrison Hoiles, a farmer, and his wife, Ann Ladd Hoiles.  The family farm was located on the outskirts of the town, which had 4,000 inhabitants at that time.  Hoiles went to a school in town; in his elderliness he remarked that the most important thing he had learned there was "that the State, or a majority of citizens, had the right to use taxation to support the public school system". He once mockingly said of his education that "attending government schools … handicapped me in developing my moral and mental faculties. … [I]n short it retarded my education." According to Carl Watner, Hoiles learned from his father at the time he graduated from high school that he should "never ask anybody to do something for him that he was not prepared to do himself". He later studied electrical engineering at Mt. Union College in Ohio, where he worked as a subscription solicitor for The Alliance Review, a newspaper edited by his elder brother.

In 1919, shortly after the end of World War I, Hoiles, together with his elder brother, sought to expand their media empire. The first newspaper of which they took possession was Lorain Times Herald, the second was Mansfield News—Hoiles served as publisher for both of them. Believing that what the country needed were newspapers that "believe in moral principles and have enough courage to express these principles", Hoiles, then aged 56, purchased Santa Ana Register, a daily newspaper for the Californian town of Santa Ana.

Political views
Hoiles wanted to abolish public schooling (which he called "taxpayer supported schools") and advocated the secession of the United States from the United Nations. He opposed the presidential candidacies of Dwight D. Eisenhower and Robert A. Taft, finding their views not sufficiently libertarian. None of his newspapers did, however, endorse any candidate for public office.

The Register was also one of the few American newspapers that decried the internment of Japanese Americans during World War II.

In a 1964 interview with The New York Times, Hoiles described himself as a voluntaryist, stating that "government should exist only to try to protect the rights of every individual, not to redistribute the property, manipulate the economy, or establish a pattern of society."

References

External links
 Doherty, Brian (2007-04-10) R.C. Hoiles, American Original, Reason

American newspaper chain founders
20th-century American newspaper publishers (people)
1878 births
1970 deaths
American libertarians
Freedom Communications
Old Right (United States)
People from Alliance, Ohio
Voluntaryists
Journalists from Ohio